Ingrid Øvre Wiik (née Hansen, June 23, 1918 – June 10, 1999) was a Norwegian actress.

Family
Ingrid Øvre Wiik was born in Tromsdalen, the daughter of Petter Hilmar Hansen (1884–1968) from Balsfjord and Ivanna Sofie Andreassen (1887–1970) from Andersdal, a village in the municipality of Tromsø. They lived at the Øvre farm. She married Arne Marius Wiik (1914–1996) from Mysen in 1950.

Career
Øvre Wiik made her stage debut at the Bjørnevik Theater as Lilly in Skjærgårdsflirt in 1943. There, among other roles, she later played Clara Eynsford-Hill in Pygmalion and Borghild Stordal in Kranes konditori. She debuted at the New Theater in 1947. In 1967 she received her first major role in Jean Anouilh's Eurydice at the New Theater, where she performed until 1967.

In the 1970s and 1980s, Øvre Wiik was engaged with the Norwegian Theater and the National Traveling Theater. In 1977 she played the title role in the world premiere of Gunvor Øwre's Marta at the Norwegian Theater. In addition to her theater performances, she worked as a film and television actress. Øvre Wiik made her screen debut in 1951 in Edith Carlmar's Skadeskutt, and she appeared in 24 film roles altogether from 1951 to 1993. Her last appearance was in the television miniseries Morsarvet.

Filmography

 1951: Skadeskutt as Miss Brun, a patient
 1957: Slalåm under himmelen as Mrs. Berntsen, Riesing's neighbor
 1958: I slik en natt as the nurse
 1958: Ut av mørket
 1959: Støv på hjernen as a housewife at the meeting
 1959: Ung flukt as the social worker
 1959: 5 loddrett as Miss Lyng, a cashier
 1963: Frokostpause (TV)
 1963: Kanutten og Romeo Clive (TV series)
 1965: Stoppested (TV)
 1966: Broder Gabrielsen as Miss Berge
 1966: Lille Lord Fauntleroy (TV series)
 1966: Kom tilbake, lille Sheba (TV)
 1969: Himmel og helvete as Mrs. Lauritzen
 1973: Et dukkehjem (TV)
 1973: To fluer i ett smekk as a lady
 1977: Lykkespill (TV series)
 1980: Guro (TV series)
 1981: Fleksnes fataliteter (TV series)
 1982: Leve sitt liv as Elizabeth
 1985: Adjø solidaritet as Eigil's mother
 1987: Av måneskinn gror det ingenting (TV series)
 1988: Polisen som vägrade ta semester (TV series)
 1993: Morsarvet (TV series)

References

External links
 
 Ingrid Øvre Wiik at Sceneweb
 Ingrid Øvre Wiik at the Swedish Film Database
 Ingrid Øvre Wiik at Filmfront

1918 births
1999 deaths
20th-century Norwegian actresses
People from Tromsø